Landsmeer is a municipality and a town in the Netherlands, in the province of North Holland.

Population centres 
The municipality of Landsmeer consists of the three villages: Den Ilp, Landsmeer, Purmerland.

Topography

Dutch topographic map of the municipality of Landsmeer, June 2015

Local government 
The municipal council of Landsmeer consists of 15 seats, which are divided as follows:

Town twinning
Landsmeer is twinned with the following towns:

Notable people 
 Sam Olij (1900–1975) a Dutch heavyweight boxer, competed the 1928 Summer Olympics, member of the national socialist NSB party in WW11
 Jaap Oudkerk (born 1937) a retired cyclist, competed the 1960 and 1964 Summer Olympics
 Bernt Schneiders (born 1959) a Dutch politician, Mayor of Landsmeer 1995-2001
 Cor Bakker (born 1961) a Dutch pianist
 Enzo Stroo (born 1994) a Dutch footballer

Gallery

References

External links 

Official website

 
Municipalities of North Holland
Populated places in North Holland